Harris Tower may refer to:
 Harris Switch Tower, an interlocking tower in Harrisburg, Pennsylvania
 Harris Tower (Atlanta), building that is a part of Peachtree Center in downtown Atlanta, Georgia